Thomas Forstner (born December 3, 1969 in Deutsch-Wagram, Lower Austria) is a singer who has represented Austria in the Eurovision Song Contest twice. In 1989 he performed "Nur ein Lied" in Lausanne, giving Austria the fifth place — their highest position since their last win in 1966 and until Austria's win in 2014. Forstner was selected to represent Austria again in Rome in 1991. His entry, "Venedig im Regen" came in last at 22nd, failing to score a single point.

Discography 
 1987 She's always a lady (SI)
 1987 South African Children (SI)
 1988 Vera (SI)
 1989 Nur ein Lied (07INCH45)
 1989 Nur ein Lied (MX)
 1989 Wenn Nachts die Sonne scheint / Don't Say Goodbye Tonight (07INCH45, 12INCH45)
 1989 Song of Love (SI)
 1990 Wenn der Himmel brennt (CD-SI)
 1990 V/A: 16 Megahits (CD)
 1991 Venedig im Regen (SI), Miles Away (SI)
 1993 Stark genug (CD-SI)
 1994 Voll erwischt (CD-SI)
 2001 You're in the army now (pseud. STG77) (MX)
 2002 Hello (pseud. Vincent Parker) (MX)

Sources 
 Information about Thomas Forstner

1969 births
Living people
People from Deutsch-Wagram
21st-century Austrian male singers
English-language singers from Austria
Eurovision Song Contest entrants for Austria
Eurovision Song Contest entrants of 1989
Eurovision Song Contest entrants of 1991